The Elbrus 2000, E2K is a Russian 512-bit wide VLIW microprocessor developed by Moscow Center of SPARC Technologies (MCST) and fabricated by TSMC.

It supports two instruction set architectures (ISA):

 Elbrus VLIW
 Intel x86 (a complete, system-level implementation with a software dynamic binary translation virtual machine, similar to Transmeta Crusoe)

Thanks to its unique architecture the Elbrus 2000 can execute 20 instructions per clock, so even with its modest clock speed it can compete with much faster clocked superscalar microprocessors when running in native VLIW mode.

For security reasons the Elbrus 2000 architecture implements dynamic data type-checking during execution. In order to prevent unauthorized access, each pointer has additional type information that is verified when the associated data is accessed.

Supported operating systems
 Linux running directly on Elbrus ISA
 Linux compiled for x86 ISA via binary translation of x86 ISA
 Windows 95, Windows XP and Windows 2000, via binary translation of x86 ISA
 QNX
 Embox

Elbrus 2000 information

Successors
 Elbrus-2S+, produced 2011 by TSMC Taiwan
 Elbrus-2SM, pilot production 2014 by Mikron Russia
 Elbrus-4S, ready for serial production 2014
 Elbrus-8S, produced 2015 by TSMC Taiwan

References

External links
 Video of booting Windows 2000 on Elbrus microprocessor
 Specifications of E2K at MSCT (In Russian)
 Architecture of E2K  (In Russian)

Russian inventions
Very long instruction word computing
X86 microprocessors
VLIW microprocessors